Giuseppe Casti (born 18 July 1964) is an Italian politician.

He is member of the Democratic Party. He served as Mayor of Carbonia from 2011 to 2016.

Biography
Giuseppe Casti was born in Carbonia, Italy in 1964.

References 

Living people
1964 births
Democratic Party (Italy) politicians
Mayors of Carbonia
21st-century Italian politicians
20th-century Italian politicians